Mediabad (also Romanized as Mehdīābād and Medīābād) is a village in Ali Jamal Rural District, in the Central District of Boshruyeh County, South Khorasan Province, Iran. At the 2006 census, its population was 9, in 4 families.

References 

Populated places in Boshruyeh County